Lost in Reverie is the third studio album release from the Norwegian avant-garde metal band Peccatum. It was released in 2004 on Mnemosyne Productions, the label run by band members Ihsahn and Ihriel.

Track listing 
 "Desolate Ever After" - 8:26
 "In the Bodiless Heart" - 7:03
 "Parasite My Heart" - 6:23
 "Veils of Blue" - 6:05
 "Black Star" - 8:14
 "Stillness" - 7:12
 "The Banks of This River Is Night" - 6:34

 All Songs Written By Ihriel and Ihsahn.

Personnel 
 Ihsahn: Vocals, Keyboards, Programming, Guitar, Bass-guitar, Strings
 Ihriel: Vocals, Keyboards
 Jarle Havrås: Drums
+
 Knut Aalefjær – Drums and Percussion on 2, 3, 4, 5
 PZ – Vocals on 3, 5
 Einar Solberg – Vocals on 3, 5

References

External links
  Official artist website
 Official record label website

Peccatum albums
2004 albums